Henry Forbes Angus,  (April 19, 1891 – September 17, 1991) was a Canadian lawyer and academic.

Born in Victoria, British Columbia, he received a Bachelor of Arts from McGill University in 1911. He received a Bachelor of Arts and a Bachelor of Civil Law from Oxford University in 1914. He was awarded the Vinerian Scholarship. He fought in India during World War I. After the war, he received a Master of Arts from Oxford University. Returning to British Columbia, he was called to the Bar.

In 1919, he became an assistant professor of economics in the political science and sociology faculty at the University of British Columbia and later became professor and head of the department. He was the first fully qualified lawyer to serve on the full-time teaching staff. From 1948 until his retirement in 1956, he was the first Dean of Graduate Studies.

From 1937 to 1940, he was a member of the Royal Commission of Dominion–Provincial Relations. From 1949 to 1951, he was a member of the Royal Commission of Transportation.

During World War II, from 1941 to 1945, he was Special Assistant to the Secretary of State for External Affairs. He was one of the few public voices to oppose the Japanese Canadian internment.

In 1955, he was appointed chairman of the Public Utilities Commission of British Columbia. In 1965, he was chairman of the British Columbia Commission of inquiry into redefinition of Electoral Districts ("The Provincial Redistribution Commission").

From 1951 to 1952, he was the president of the Royal Society of Canada.

In 1971, he was made an officer of the Order of Canada. In 1956, he was awarded a Doctor of Laws, honoris causa, from the University of British Columbia. The Henry Angus Building at the University of British Columbia is named in his honour.

References
 
 

1891 births
1991 deaths
Canadian centenarians
Canadian economists
Lawyers in British Columbia
Canadian university and college faculty deans
Alumni of the University of Oxford
McGill University alumni
Men centenarians
Officers of the Order of Canada
People from Victoria, British Columbia
Academic staff of the University of British Columbia